Maharaja Hat is a census town in Raiganj CD Block in Raiganj subdivision of Uttar Dinajpur district in the Indian state of West Bengal.

Demographics
As per the 2011 Census of India, Maharaja Hat had a total population of 10,067, of which 5,221 (52%) were males and 4,846 (48%) were females. Population below 6 years was 914. The total number of literates in Maharaja Hat was 7,695 (84.07% of the population over 6 years).

 India census, Maharaja Hat had a population of 9,842. Males constitute 53% of the population and females 47%. Maharaja Hat has an average literacy rate of 73%, higher than the national average of 59.5%: male literacy is 79%, and female literacy is 67%. In Kasba, 11% of the population is under 6 years of age.

Education
 mahaharajahat high school
 mahaharajahat primary school
 mahaharajahat shishu thitha school

Health
Maharaja Hat have a 1 hospital name Raiganj BPHC 10 bed avilivel,

Transport
Mine highway Raiganj Bindol via Maharaja Hat this road is distinct Highway, and maharaja bhatol via runia Road,& Maharaja jikia via Panisalahat Road.

References

Cities and towns in Uttar Dinajpur district